Don't You Wait may refer to:
 "Don't You Wait" (Solange Knowles song) (2016)
 "Don't You Wait", a 2016 song by Embrace